General elections were held in Japan on 10 May 1920. The result was a victory for the Rikken Seiyūkai party led by Hara Takashi, which won 278 of the 464 seats.

Electoral system
Following electoral reforms in 1919, the 464 members of the House of Representatives were elected in 295 single-member constituencies, 68 two-member constituencies and 11 three-member constituencies. Voting was restricted to men aged over 25 who paid at least 3 yen a year in direct taxation, reduced from 10 yen in the 1917 elections, increasing the proportion of the population able to vote to 6%.

Results

References

General elections in Japan
Japan
1920 elections in Japan
May 1920 events
Election and referendum articles with incomplete results